WHRD is a Christian radio station licensed to Freeport, Illinois, broadcasting on 106.9 MHz FM.  WHRD is an affiliate of Moody Radio, and is owned by Northwestern Illinois Radio Fellowship.

References

External links
WHRD's website

HRD